Jeon Kwang-hoon or Jun Gwang-hoon (born 28 March 1956) is a South Korean pastor and politician. He is the incumbent President of the Christian Council of Korea. He was also the former President of the now-defunct Party of Practice of Christian Love, as well as one of key figures to found the Christian Liberal Party.

Early life and education 
Jeon Kwang-hoon was born in Uiseong, North Gyeongsang, in 1956. He attended to Kwangwoon Electronics Technical High School in Seoul. He received a bachelor's degree in theology at Daehan Theological University and a master's degree in Anyang University.

Political position 
He is mentioned in many major South Korean media outlets as a far-right pastor. The New York Times described Jeon as a populist, pointing out similarities to Western right-wing populism.

He is officially an independent but is practically recognized as a member of the Christian Liberty Unification Party. He said the only thing that could blow up homosexuals and Juchesasangpas was CLUP, and appealed for support.

Controversies 
At a rally in Daegu in 2005, Jeon said, "if female believers take off their underwear for me, they are one of my believers, and if they don't, they are shit," and led to the so-called "panties controversy."  After the fact, in an interview with the Hankyoreh, he explained how the true intent of his statement was very much distorted. At a rally in Cheonan in 2006, he made a sexist comment to the effect "women should not come to church wearing short skirts."
During the time of the 2007 Presidential election in South Korea he made various statements interfering with the election, including the statement, "if you do not vote for Elder Lee Myung-bak, you will be erased from the book of life," leading to criticism from many citizens and believers alike.
In March 2020, Jeon was indicted over allegations of violating South Korean election law. According to the allegations, he encouraged supporters to vote against Moon at a rally outside of the official campaigning period. He was released on bail on the condition that he not take part in rallies related to his pending case.
During the COVID-19 pandemic in South Korea, Jeon's church defied outbreak control measures, and was prohibited from gatherings.
On 18 August 2020, the South Korean health ministry and Seoul city government filed separate criminal complaints against Jeon following his activity in organizing Liberation Day rallies in Seoul. He is accused of hindering infection control efforts by discouraging worshipers from getting tested, under-reporting church membership to health authorities, and attending rallies while under a quarantine order. Jeon's lawyers and Sarang Jeil Church have denied the allegations. From 13 August 2020 to 18 August 2020, the church was tied to more than 300 confirmed cases of COVID-19 transmission, leading to a tightening of social distancing rules in Seoul. Jeon himself, although asymptomatic, tested positive for the disease.

References 

1956 births
Living people
South Korean pastors
South Korean politicians
People from Uiseong County
Far-right politics in South Korea
Right-wing populism in South Korea
South Korean anti-communists
COVID-19 pandemic in South Korea